Alex (18 May 1976 – 6 September 2007) was a grey parrot and the subject of a thirty-year experiment by animal psychologist Irene Pepperberg, initially at the University of Arizona and later at Harvard University and Brandeis University. When Alex was about one year old, Pepperberg bought him at a pet shop. In her book "Alex & Me", Pepperberg describes her unique relationship with Alex and how Alex helped her understand animal minds.  Alex was an acronym for avian language experiment, or avian learning experiment. He was compared to Albert Einstein and at two years old was correctly answering questions made for six-year-olds.

Before Pepperberg's work with Alex, it was widely believed in the scientific community that a large primate brain was needed to handle complex problems related to language and understanding; birds were not considered to be intelligent, as their only common use of communication was mimicking and repeating sounds to interact with each other. However, Alex's accomplishments supported the idea that birds may be able to reason on a basic level and use words creatively. Pepperberg wrote that Alex's intelligence was on a level similar to dolphins and great apes. She also reported that Alex seemed to show the intelligence of a five-year-old human in some respects, and had not reached his full potential by the time he died. She believed that he possessed the emotional level of a two-year-old human at the time of his death.

Early life 
Animal psychologist Irene Pepperberg bought Alex at a pet store while working as a researcher at Purdue University. She believes that Alex may have had his wings clipped when he was young, which could have prevented him from learning to fly.

Training 
Alex's training used a model/rival technique, in which the student (Alex) observes trainers interacting. One of the trainers models the desired student behavior, and is seen by the student as a rival for the other trainer's attention. The trainer and model/rival exchange roles so the student can see that the process is interactive. Pepperberg reported that during times when she and an assistant were having a conversation and made mistakes, Alex would correct them.

This technique helped Pepperberg succeed with Alex where other scientists had failed in facilitating two-way communication with parrots. In later years, Alex sometimes assumed the role of one of Pepperberg's assistants by acting as the "model" and "rival" in helping to teach a fellow parrot in the lab. Alex sometimes practiced words when he was alone.

Accomplishments 
Pepperberg did not claim that Alex could use "language", instead saying that he used a two-way communications code. Listing Alex's accomplishments in 1999, Pepperberg said he could identify 50 different objects and recognize quantities up to six; that he could distinguish seven colors and five shapes, and understand the concepts of "bigger", "smaller", "same", and "different", and that he was learning "over" and "under". Alex passed increasingly difficult tests measuring whether humans have achieved Piaget's Substage 6 object permanence. Alex showed surprise and anger when confronted with a nonexistent object or one different from what he had been led to believe was hidden during the tests.

Alex had a vocabulary of over 100 words, but was exceptional in that he appeared to have understanding of what he said. For example, when Alex was shown an object and asked about its shape, color, or material, he could label it correctly. He could describe a key as a key no matter what its size or color, and could determine how the key was different from others. Looking at a mirror, he said "what color", and learned the word "grey" after being told "grey" six times. This made him the first and only non-human animal to have ever asked a question, let alone an existential one (apes who have been trained to use sign-language have so far failed to ever ask a single question).  

Alex was said to have understood the turn-taking of communication and sometimes the syntax used in language. He called an apple a "banerry" (pronounced as rhyming with some pronunciations of "canary"), which a linguist friend of Pepperberg's thought to be a combination of "banana" and "cherry", two fruits he was more familiar with.

Alex could add, to a limited extent, correctly giving the number of similar objects on a tray. Pepperberg said that if he could not count, the data could be interpreted as his being able to estimate quickly and accurately the number of something, better than humans can. When he was tired of being tested, he would say "Wanna go back", meaning he wanted to go back to his cage, and in general, he would request where he wanted to be taken by saying "Wanna go ...", protest if he was taken to a different place, and sit quietly when taken to his preferred spot. He was not trained to say where he wanted to go, but picked it up from being asked where he would like to be taken.

If the researcher displayed irritation, Alex tried to defuse it with the phrase, "I'm sorry." If he said "Wanna banana", but was offered a nut instead, he stared in silence, asked for the banana again, or took the nut and threw it at the researcher or otherwise displayed annoyance, before requesting the item again. When asked questions in the context of research testing, he gave the correct answer approximately 80 percent of the time.

Once, Alex was given several different colored blocks (two red, three blue, and four green—similar to the picture above). Pepperberg asked him, "What color three?" expecting him to say blue. However, as Alex had been asked this question before, he seemed to have become bored. He answered "five!" This kept occurring until Pepperberg said "Fine, what color five?" Alex replied "none". This was said to suggest that parrots, like humans, get bored. Sometimes, Alex answered the questions incorrectly, despite knowing the correct answer.

Preliminary research also seems to indicate that Alex could carry over the concept of four blue balls of wool on a tray to four notes from a piano. Pepperberg was also training him to recognize the symbol "4" as "four". Alex also showed some comprehension of personal pronouns; he used different language when referring to himself or others, indicating a concept of "I" and "you".

In July 2005, Pepperberg reported that Alex understood the concept of zero. If asked the difference between two objects, he also answered that; but if there was no difference between the objects, he said "none", which meant that he understood the concept of nothing or zero. In July 2006, Pepperberg discovered that Alex's perception of optical illusions was similar to human perception.

Pepperberg was training Alex to recognize English graphemes, in the hope that he would conceptually relate an English written word with the spoken word. He could identify sounds made by two-letter combinations such as SH and OR.

Death 
Alex's death on 6 September 2007, at age 31, came as a surprise, as the average life span for a grey parrot in captivity is 45 years. His last words ("You be good, I love you. See you tomorrow.") were the same words that he would say every night when Pepperberg left the lab.

Criticisms 

Some academics are skeptical of Pepperberg's findings, asserting without data or peer-reviewed publication concerning Alex's data, that Alex's communications is operant conditioning. Nim Chimpsky, a chimpanzee, was thought to be using language, but there is some debate over whether he simply imitated his teacher. Herbert Terrace, who worked with Nim Chimpsky, says he thinks Alex performed by rote rather than by using language; without peer-reviewed publication he claims Alex's responses are "a complex discriminating performance", adding that he believes that in every situation, "there is an external stimulus that guides his response."

See also

References

External links 
 Alex Foundation
 Obituary article at the web-site of The Economist magazine
 New York Times obituary article
 The New York Times article
 "The Language of Birds" article includes a transcript and audio sample of Alex

 Audio of Australian radio interview with Irene Pepperberg
 Wired: Parrot Proves It's No Birdbrain
 Life with Alex: a memoir Film tribute to Alex.

1976 animal births
2007 animal deaths
Animal intelligence
Individual parrots
Individual talking birds
Psittacini
Individual animals in the United States

ceb:Alex, Haute-Savoie